La Quiaca Airport is a very high elevation airport serving La Quiaca, a town in the Jujuy Province of Argentina. La Quiaca is on the border with Bolivia, across from the Bolivian town of Villazon.

See also

Transport in Argentina
List of airports in Argentina

References

External links 
OpenStreetMap - La Quiaca Airport

FallingRain - La Quiaca Airport

Airports in Argentina
Jujuy Province